The city of Ottawa, Canada held municipal elections on December 2, 1935.

Mayor of Ottawa

Plebiscites

(Only property owners could vote for the following measure)

Ottawa Board of Control
(4 elected)

Ottawa City Council
(2 elected from each ward)

References
Ottawa Citizen, December 3, 1935

Municipal elections in Ottawa
1935 elections in Canada
1930s in Ottawa
1935 in Ontario
December 1935 events